Diliprao Dagdojirao Deshmukh (born 18 April 1950) is an Indian politician, and younger brother of Vilasrao Deshmukh. He served as the Minister of State for Finance & Planning in the state of Maharashtra under Chief Minister Sushil Kumar Shinde.

Deshmukh was elected to the legislative council of Maharashtra in 2000. He served as Cabinet Minister under Ashok Chavan. Prior to entering politics, Deshmukh was the vice-chairman of Maharashtra State Cooperative Bank.

References

Indian National Congress politicians
People from Latur
People from Maharashtra
Members of the Maharashtra Legislative Council
Marathi politicians
Living people
1950 births
People from Marathwada
Maharashtra district councillors
People from Latur district